"Download It" is the debut single by English girl group Clea. It was released in the UK on 22 September 2003 and just missed the top 20 charting at No. 21, selling 12,050 copies in the UK. The single had average promotion, being performed on shows like Top of the Pops.
The song appears on their international debut album, Identity Crisis, and was re-recorded for their UK debut album Trinity, although Morgan's vocals were not added.

Music video
Clea filmed a video for this single in Vancouver, Canada, with four girls in a house as if they were digital humans or similar. It does not have a proper plot, but it can be inferred that they are watching someone. The video appears on the DVD single.

Another version of the video was released without Chloe Morgan, who left in May 2004.

Track listings and formats
CD single
"Download It [radio edit]"
"Mind Games"
"Download It [Sergio mix]"

DVD single
"Download It [video]"
"Mind Games"
"Download It [Cicada remix]"
"Download It [Behind the Scenes]"
"Photo Gallery, Bio, Lyrics"

Charts

References

2003 songs
2003 debut singles
Clea (group) songs
Warner Music Group singles
Songs written by Tom Nichols (songwriter)